Saint-Bonnet-Briance (Limousin: Sent Bonet Briança) is a commune in the Haute-Vienne department in the Nouvelle-Aquitaine region in west-central France.

Geography
The river Briance forms most of the commune's southern border.

See also
Communes of the Haute-Vienne department

References

Communes of Haute-Vienne